Veldin Hodža (born 15 October 2002) is a Croatian professional footballer currently playing as a defensive midfielder for Prva HNL club Rijeka.

Club career
On 7 October 2020, Hodža made his senior competitive debut against Dilj in Croatian Football Cup first round. He scored a goal in the 69th minute and Rijeka won 6-0. On 26 November 2020, Hodža made his first appearance in a European cup competition, coming in as a subsubstitue in the 87th minute for Gnezda Čerin in their Europa League group stage match against Napoli. He then joined Orijent on loan in the winter transfer window. He was taken off loan to Orijent and moved back to Rijeka where his contract was formally terminated and he joined newly promoted club Hrvatski Dragovoljac to help with their relegation battle.

On 20 June 2022, Hodža rejoined his former club Rijeka signing a contract until summer 2024.

International career 
Hodža represents Croatia at youth international level and has made several appearances for various youth teams. He was called by Croatia U21's coach Igor Bišćan for their 2023 European Under-21 qualifiers against Norway on 3 June 2022 and Estonia on 8 June 2022.

Personal life 
Born in Rijeka, Hodža is of Gorani origin from Restelicë.

References

External links

2002 births
Living people
Footballers from Rijeka
Association football midfielders
Croatian footballers
Croatia youth international footballers
Croatia under-21 international footballers
HNK Rijeka players
HNK Orijent players
NK Hrvatski Dragovoljac players
Croatian Football League players
Gorani people
Croatian people of Kosovan descent